Barbitistes serricauda is a species belonging to the family Tettigoniidae  subfamily Phaneropterinae. It is found in most of Europe. The imagines can be found from July to September on sunny forest edges and shrubs. They are mostly nocturnal.

References

Orthoptera of Europe
Insects described in 1798
Phaneropterinae